Cleopatra bulimoides is a species of freshwater snails with an operculum, aquatic gastropod molluscs in the family Paludomidae.

Cleopatra bulimoides is the type species of the genus Cleopatra.

The holotype was found inside a mummy of an ibis (Alexandria channel, Egypt)

Varieties
 Cleopatra bulimoides var. richardi Germain, 1911
 Cleopatra bulimoides var. welwitschi E. von Martens, 1897
 Cleopatra bulimoides var. nsendweensis Dupuis & Putzeys, 1902: synonym of Cleopatra nsendweensis (Dupuis & Putzeys, 1902) (basionym)

Distribution
This species occurs in:
 Egypt
 Benin
 Sudan
 ...

Ecology
Parasites of Cleopatra bulimoides include the trematode Aspidogaster conchicola.

References

 Bourguignat, J.-R. (1885). Mollusques recueillis par M. Paul Soleillet dans son voyage au Choa (Éthiopie méridionale), 1-48, 1 pl. Paris (Mme Ve Tremblay)
 Brown, D. S. (1980). Freshwater snails of Africa and their medical importance. Taylor & Francis, London. 1-487
 Connolly, M. (1925). The non-marine Mollusca of Portuguese East Africa. Transactions of the Royal Society of South Africa, 12 (3): 105-220, pl. 4-8. Cape Town

External links
 Olivier, G.A. (1804). Voyage dans l'Empire Othoman, l'Égypte et la Perse, fair par ordre du Gouvernement, pendant les six premières années de la République. Tome second, ii pp. + 466 pp. + Errata (1 pp.); Atlas, 2d livraison: vii pp., pl. 18-32. Paris (H. Agasse)

Paludomidae
Gastropods described in 1804